Junior G - The Magic Starts Now... is an Indian superhero television drama series which premiered on 10 November 2001 on DD National. It was directed by Ganshyam Pathak.

It features adventures of the orphan boy Gaurav Ray, who can transform to his secret identity Junior G with his magical ring. The boy got his supernatural ability when he accidentally stumbles into the crash between two asteroids. Emerging a much-empowered child from the collision, his mission becomes to destroy the evil wizard genius, Fyumancho.

Plot 
A 12 year old orphan, Gaurav Ray who lives with his kind uncle. But at his uncle Gaurav Ray's house he is often abused by his aunt and cousin, Rahul. One day, Gaurav accidentally stumbles into a collision between two asteroids. As a result of the collision, Gaurav is given a ring with magical sacred powers that allows him to transform into the superhero, Junior G. Now, his mission is to defeat the evil wizard Fyomancho who killed his parents.

Cast
Amitesh Kochhar as Gaurav/ Junior G
Pramod Moutho as Fyumancho
Meenakshi Verma
KK Goswami
Kavi Kumar Azad
Peeya Rai Chowdhary
Mugdha Chaphekar
Addite Shirwaikar
Pranit Bhatt
Pradeep Kabra
Yogesh tripathi
Banwari Lal Jhol
Poonam Katare

References

External links 
 
Junior-G at SimpliTube

Television superheroes
Indian children's television series
2001 Indian television series debuts
Indian superhero television shows
DD National original programming
Indian fantasy television series